The Final Mask (German:Die letzte Maske) is a 1924 German silent drama film directed by Emmerich Hanus and starring Margarete Lanner and Wilhelm Diegelmann.

Cast
In alphabetical order
 Alf Blütecher 
 Wilhelm Diegelmann 
 Arnold Korff 
 Margarete Lanner 
 Martin Lübbert 
 Louis Ralph

References

Bibliography
 Grange, William. Cultural Chronicle of the Weimar Republic. Scarecrow Press, 2008.

External links

1924 films
Films of the Weimar Republic
Films directed by Emmerich Hanus
German silent feature films
German black-and-white films
German drama films
1924 drama films
Silent drama films
1920s German films
1920s German-language films